Olpidiaceae is a fungal plant pathogen family of genera, that was placed in the order Olpidiales.

Taxonomy
Based on the work of Philippe Silar and "The Mycota: A Comprehensive Treatise on Fungi as Experimental Systems for Basic and Applied Research" and synonyms from "Part 1- Virae, Prokarya, Protists, Fungi".
 Phylum Olpidiomycota Doweld 2013 [Olpidiomycotina Doweld 2013]
 Class Olpidiomycetes Doweld 2013
 Order Olpidiales Cavalier-Smith 2012
 Family Olpidiaceae Schröter 1889
 Genus Agratia Mol. Nov. 2014 [Morella Pérez Reyes 1964 non Loureiro 1790]
 Genus Chytridhaema Moniez 1887
 Genus Cibdelia Juel 1925
 Genus Leiolpidium Doweld 2014
 Genus Monochytrium Griggs 1910
 Genus Olpidiaster Saccas 1954 non Pascher 1917
 Genus Perolpidium Doweld 2014
 Genus Schizolpidium Doweld 2014
 Genus Olpidium Rabenhorst  1868 [Chytridium (Olpidium) Braun 1856; Asterocystis de Wildeman 1893 non Gobi 1879; Cyphidium Magnus 1875; Diplochytrium Tomaschek 1878; Olpidiella Lagerheim 1888; Endolpidium de Wildeman 1894; Diplochytridium Karling 1971; Olpidiaster Pascher 1917 non Saccas 1954]

References

External links 

Chytridiomycota